Mournful Cries is the fourth studio album by American doom metal band Saint Vitus, released in 1988. It was the band's last release on SST Records. The cover art features a painting of a hydra.

Track listing
All songs written by Dave Chandler, except where noted.

Side one
 "Intro / The Creeps" – 2:47
 "Dragon Time" – 7:27
 "Shooting Gallery" – 6:45

Side two
 "Intro / Bitter Truth" (Scott Weinrich) – 4:14
 "The Troll" – 6:57
 "Looking Glass" (Weinrich) – 4:50

Personnel
Saint Vitus
 Scott "Wino" Weinrich – vocals, guitar on tracks 2, 4, 6
 Dave Chandler – guitar, growl on track 2
 Mark Adams – bass
 Armando Acosta – drums

Production
Joe Carducci – producer
Casey McMackin & Keith – engineers

References

Saint Vitus (band) albums
1988 albums
SST Records albums